William Weaver Tomlinson, historian, is known for his histories of the north east of England, in particular for his Comprehensive guide to the county of Northumberland. (1888) and his history of the North Eastern Railway: The North Eastern Railway; its rise and development, published 1915.

Biography
William Weaver Tomlinson born on 15 October 1858. Tomlinson's father was employed by the Hull and Selby Railway and in 1873 William Weaver joined the North Eastern Railway (NER) as an accountant.

He spent many years living at Monkseaton in the north east of England.

The book 'The North Eastern Railway; its rise and development' was published in 1915, having been written between 1900 and 1914 with the backing of the NER. It gives a detailed account of the history of the NER to 1880, and of its predecessor companies; the history from 1880 to 1904 is more briefly covered, partly due to ill health of the author; the key events in period 1904 to 1915 were covered in an appendix. His history of the railway is regarded as an accurate, comprehensive and authoritative history of the company.

He died on 26 November 1916.

Works

'The North Eastern Railway ..' was reprinted in 1967, with a foreword by Ken Hoole.

References

Other sources

External links

19th-century English historians
North Eastern Railway (UK) people
Northumbria
Rail transport writers
1858 births
1916 deaths
20th-century English historians